Andrea Petagna (born 30 June 1995) is an Italian professional footballer who plays as a striker for  club Monza, on loan from Napoli. He has also previously represented the Italy national team.

Club career

AC Milan and loans
Petagna started his football career in AC Milan's youth system, where he was a member of the under-15 squad who won the Campionato Nazionale Giovanissimi in 2010 and a member of the under-17 squad who won the Campionato Nazionale Allievi the following year. He made his professional debut on 4 December 2012, coming on as a substitute in the late stages of a UEFA Champions League group stage home game against Zenit St. Petersburg, which Milan lost 0–1.

At the start of the 2013–14 season, Petagna was promoted full-time to the first team. He made his Serie A debut on 24 August 2013, coming on as a late substitute in the opening game, a 2–1 away loss against newly promoted Hellas Verona. However, following the acquisition of Alessandro Matri in the late days of the summer transfer window, Milan decided they would let Petagna go out on loan to Sampdoria in order to gain more first team experience. Sampdoria also had the option to make the deal a co-ownership agreement at the end of the season-long loan spell. In spite of that, the loan was terminated early and Petagna returned to Milan in January, having made five scoreless appearances during his stay at Sampdoria. He finished the season with three more senior appearances, while being mainly employed by the under-19 squad managed by Filippo Inzaghi. The side won the Viareggio Cup in February, defeating Anderlecht in the final, with Petagna scoring the equaliser for the rossoneri in a 3–1 win.

On 16 July 2014, Petagna was loaned out to Serie B side Latina ahead of the 2014–15 season. On 13 January 2015, he was signed by Vicenza on loan.

On 30 August 2015, he was signed by Serie B newcomers Ascoli on loan.

Atalanta and Ascoli loan
On 25 January 2016, Petagna signed for Atalanta and was loaned to former club Ascoli until 30 June 2016.

SPAL
On 19 July 2018, Petagna signed for SPAL on loan until 30 June 2019 with an obligation to buy.	
He scored his first goal with S.P.A.L. in his debut match on 12 August, scoring the final 1-0 goal in the Coppa Italia third round match against Spezia He scored his first Serie A goals with the Emilian side on 17 September, scoring a double that allowed the Biancazzurri to beat his former side Atalanta 2-0. He made 37 appearances scoring 17 goals in all competitions, On 1 July 2019, Petagna was signed on a permanent deal by SPAL.

Napoli
On 30 January 2020, Petagna signed with Napoli. He stayed at SPAL on loan until the end of 2019–20 season.

Monza 
On 12 August 2022, Petagna joined newly-promoted Serie A side Monza, with an obligation for purchase if certain conditions are met. He made his debut for Monza on 14 August, as a starter in a 2–1 Serie A defeat to Torino.

On October 19, Petagna scored his first goal for the biancorossi, sealing the 3–2 comeback win in the round of 32 match against Udinese. On 31 October, he scored the first goal Serie A goal for Monza, from a penalty kick, momentarily giving his side the advantage in the home match against Bologna, which eventually ended in a 2–1 defeat.

International career
Petagna won five caps for Italy under-16 between 2010 and 2011. In 2011, he won one further cap for Italy under-17. He went on to be capped for Italy under-18, making eight appearances and scoring two goals in 2013. In 2013, he was also capped for Italy under-19, making his first appearance on 24 April.

He made his debut with the Italy U21 team on 11 October 2016, in the  2017 European U21 Championship qualification match against Lithuania in Kaunas.

On 28 March 2017, Petagna made his senior international debut for the Italy national football team, along with four other players, coming on as a substitute in a 2–1 friendly away win against the Netherlands.

In June 2017, he was included in the Italy under-21 squad for the 2017 UEFA European Under-21 Championship by manager Luigi Di Biagio. On 18 June, he scored in Italy's opening match of the tournament, a 2–0 win over Denmark; this was also his only goal for the Italy U21 side. Italy were eliminated in the semi-finals following a 3–1 defeat to Spain on 27 June. Petagna gained notoriety at the tournament after winning the semifinal game, when he celebrated by taking his shorts off and showing off his briefs.

Personal life 
Petagna is the grandson of a former football player and coach  (1923–2000). He is partially of Jewish ancestry; his great-grandfather was a victim of the Holocaust in Italy.

Career statistics

Club

International

References

External links
 Profile at A.C. Monza 
 

1995 births
Living people
Footballers from Trieste
Italian people of Jewish descent
Italian footballers
Italy youth international footballers
Italy under-21 international footballers
Italy international footballers
Association football forwards
A.C. Milan players
U.C. Sampdoria players
Latina Calcio 1932 players
L.R. Vicenza players
Ascoli Calcio 1898 F.C. players
Atalanta B.C. players
S.P.A.L. players
S.S.C. Napoli players
A.C. Monza players
Serie A players
Serie B players